Deckard may refer to:

Surname 
 Historical:
 Carl R. Deckard (1961–2019), American engineer
 H. Joel Deckard (1942–2016), American politician
 John Silk Deckard (1938–1994), American printmaker and sculptor
 Ruth Deckard (fl. 1930s-1950s), American pin-up artist
 Tom Deckard (1916–1982), American runner
 Rick Deckard, fictional character of both prose Do Androids Dream of Electric Sheep?, and several Blade Runner works

Given name 

 Deckard Cain, a fictional character in the Diablo series and Heroes of the Storm

 Deckard Shaw, a fictional character in The Fast and the Furious franchise

Other 
 Deckard (band), Scottish rock band, also known as Baby Chaos